Kalesija is a town and municipality located in Tuzla Canton of the Federation of Bosnia and Herzegovina, an entity of Bosnia and Herzegovina. It is located in northeastern Bosnia and Herzegovina, east of Tuzla. As of 2013, the town has a population of 2,039 inhabitants, and the municipality has 33,053 inhabitants.

History
Atik Mosque in Vukovije Gornje was built at the end of 16th century.

Yugoslav Wars
On 2 May 1992 Kalesija was one of the first Bosnian towns to be caught in the initial Serbian offensive. On 11 May 1992, Kalesija and territory east of the river Bjeljevac except for the settlements of Zukići and Jajić were placed under occupation.

On 23 May 1992, Kalesija was retaken by Bosnian forces.

Consequences of the occupation included ethnic cleansing, population displacement and suffering, many people being taken to the camps, the destruction of Kalesija villages, destruction of religious buildings and industrial plants.

The Dayton Agreement appointed a new administrative arrangement of Bosnia and Herzegovina. 71 km2 
(26.1%) of the territory of the municipality Kalesija was ceded to Republika Srpska, becoming the new municipality of Osmaci.

Demographics

1971
The 1971 Yugoslav census showed that the population of Kalesija was 32,577 inhabitants, made up of:
24,771 Bosniaks - (76.03%)
7,606 Serbs - (23.34%)
40 Croats - (0.12%)
23 Yugoslavs - (0.07%)
137 others - (0.44%)

1991
In the 1991 census, the municipality of Kalesija had 41,795 inhabitants: 
33,226 Bosniaks (79.5%)
7,669 Serbs (18.4%)
33 Croats (0.1%)
270 Yugoslavs (0.6%)
597 others (0.4%)

2013
In the 2013 census, the municipality of Kalesija had 33,053 inhabitants:
32,227 Bosniaks (97,5%)
254 Serbs (0,76%)
20 Croats (0,06%)
552 others (1,67%)

Settlements
The municipality consist of 28 settlements:

Brezik, population 51
Bulatovci, population 302
Dubnica, population 788
Gojčin, population 421
Hrasno Donje, population 1,022
Hrasno Gornje, population 627
Jeginov Lug, population 143
Jelovo Brdo, population 489
Kalesija Grad, population 2,039
Kalesija Selo, population 2,222
Kikači, population 1,804
Lipovice, population 1,158
Memići, population 1,453
Miljanovci, population 1,918
Osmaci, uninhabited
Petrovice, population 2,460
Prnjavor, population 1,515
Rainci Donji, population 2,268
Rainci Gornji, population 1,924
Sarači, population 470
Seljublje, population 923
Staro Selo, population 22
Tojšići, population 2,484
Vukovije Donje, population 2,874
Vukovije Gornje, population 2,511
Zelina, population 103
Zolje, population 823
Zukići, population 239

Education
In the area of municipality Kalesija there are six elementary schools. They are located in Kalesija, Rainci Gornji, Gojčin, Memići, Vukovije and Tojšići.

References

External links

Kalesija online (Bosnian)
Official Website of Kalesija (Bosnian)

Cities and towns in the Federation of Bosnia and Herzegovina
Municipalities of the Tuzla Canton
Populated places in Kalesija